The Ven. William Edward Hony, MA (Oxon), BD (Cantab) (b. Liskeard 1788 – d. Salisbury 1875) was an  Anglican priest, Archdeacon of Sarum from 3 August 1846 until 31 December 1874.
Hony was educated at Exeter College, Oxford, where he matriculated in 1805, graduating B.A. in 1811, and M.A. in 1812, and was a Fellow from 1808 to 1827. He held livings at South Newington and Baverstock. Hony died on 7 January 1875.

References

1788 births
Alumni of Exeter College, Oxford
19th-century English Anglican priests
Archdeacons of Sarum
1875 deaths